Chris Banks may refer to:
Chris Banks (poet) (born 1970), Canadian poet
Chris Banks (footballer, born 1965), English former professional footballer
Chris Banks (athlete) (born 1978), American marathon runner
Chris Banks (American soccer) (born 1987), American soccer player
Chris Banks (American football) (1973–2014), former American football guard for the Denver Broncos
Christopher Banks (born 1977), New Zealand journalist, musician, record producer, songwriter and filmmaker
Chris Banks (businessman) (born 1959), British businessman